Seyyed Mohammad-Sadegh Tabatabaei was an Iranian politician, constitutionalist activist affiliated with the Secret Society and journalist.

References 

People of the Persian Constitutional Revolution
Speakers of the National Consultative Assembly
Members of the 2nd Iranian Majlis
Members of the 3rd Iranian Majlis
Members of the 5th Iranian Majlis
Members of the 14th Iranian Majlis
Ambassadors of Iran to the Ottoman Empire
Ambassadors of Iran to Turkey
Moderate Socialists Party politicians
Socialist Party (Iran) politicians
Members of the Senate of Iran